Boris Savvovich Dubrovin (real surname Gall, patronymic in some sources Savvich; ; 24 May 1926 – 25 June 2020) was a Soviet and Russian poet, songwriter and author. He was a veteran of the Great Patriotic War.

Biography 
Dubrovin was born in Moscow in 1926. His father was Savva Semenovich Gall, from Uman, Kiev Governorate, and his mother was Esfir Abelevna Khaza, from Pinsk, Minsk Governorate. His father was a typographic worker in his youth, and in the Russian Civil War he was a commissar in the First Cavalry Army. His grandfather was a church watchman. His father had a younger sister. In 1936, when Dubrovin was 9 years old, his father was arrested as an enemy of the people, and after a while his mother was arrested for not reporting on the enemy of the people. His father died in prison, after which he was rehabilitated. His mother, a doctor, served 6 years imprisonment, after which she was disabled. She was also rehabilitated.

Dubrovin graduated from high school, and during World War II he worked as a turner at a defence plant then volunteered for the infantry. From July of the same year, he was an air gunner then a mechanic in the 57th Bomber Aviation Regiment of the 221st Air Division of the 16th Air Army of the 1st Belorussian Front. He participated in the Belarusian, Vistula–Oder, East Prussian and Berlin operations. He was discharged in 1945 with the rank of senior sergeant. He was awarded an order and medals.

He engaged in literary work from 1946. His first book, На первом рубеже ("At the First Frontier"), was published in 1955. He graduated from the Maxim Gorky Literature Institute in 1958 and became a member of the Union of Soviet Writers in 1957.

He was a laureate of all-union and all-Russian literary, music and television competitions as well as international competitions; awards were received for poems to songs. He was awarded the Konstantin Simonov Literary Prize in 2015 for his last few books. At many music competitions, he received awards with composers.

Dubrovin died on 25 June 2020. He was buried at the Troyekurovskoye Cemetery.

Bibliography

Popular songs based on poems by Dubrovin

Poetry

Prose

References 

1926 births
2020 deaths
Russian poets
Maxim Gorky Literature Institute alumni
Writers from Moscow
Burials in Troyekurovskoye Cemetery